The  is an expressway in the Shikoku region of Japan. The expressway is numbered E11.

Overview

The expressway is an important route connecting the greater Osaka area with Takamatsu, the capital of Kagawa Prefecture. Beyond Takamatsu, the route follows a westerly course parallel to the Seto Inland Sea to its terminus with Matsuyama Expressway and Kōchi Expressway in Shikokuchūō.

The speed limit is 80 km/h along the majority of the route, there are some 100 km/h sections between Naruto Junction and Tsuda-Higashi Interchange and Takamatsu-Nishi Interchange and Kawanoe Junction.

History
The first section of the Takamatsu Expressway to open was between Zentsuji and Mishima-Kawanoe interchanges on 16 December 1987. The final section of the expressway (9.1 km between Takamatsu-Chūō and Takamatsu-Nishi Interchanges) was opened on 30 March 2003.

List of interchanges and features

 IC - interchange, SIC - smart interchange, JCT - junction, SA - service area, PA - parking area, BS - bus stop, TN - tunnel, TB - toll gate

Naruto TB - Takamatsu-Nishi IC 
Due to open the expressway from Takamatsu towards Matsuyama, kilometer markers between Naruto Toll Gate and Takamatsu-Nishi Interchange show the distance from Naruto Toll Gate plus 100 (the marker at Naruto Toll Gate is 100.0 while the marker at Takamatsu-Nishi Interchange is 165.4). Therefore, the exit numbers continue from the sequence of the Takamatsu-Nishi Interchange, starting at 7. 
{| class="wikitable"
|-
!style="border-bottom:3px solid green;"|No.
!style="border-bottom:3px solid green;"|Name
!style="border-bottom:3px solid green;"|Connections
!style="border-bottom:3px solid green;"|Dist. fromOrigin
!style="border-bottom:3px solid green;"|Bus Stop
!style="border-bottom:3px solid green;"|Notes
!colspan="2" style="border-bottom:3px solid green;"|Location
|-
|colspan="8" style="text-align:center;"|Through to  Kobe-Awaji-Naruto Expressway 
|-
!style="background-color: #BFB;"|TB
|Naruto TB
|style="background-color:#dcdcfe;"|
|style="background-color:#dcdcfe; text-align:right; "|100.0
|style="background-color:#dcdcfe;"|
|style="background-color:#dcdcfe;"|Sakaide-bound entrance only
|rowspan="4"|Naruto
|rowspan="5" style="width:1em;"|Tokushima
|-
! style="background:#bfb;"|12
|Naruto IC
| National Route 11 (Yoshinogawa Bypass)
|style="text-align:right;"|100.2
|style="text-align:center;"|
|
|-
! style="background:#bfb;"|7
|Naruto JCT
| Tokushima Expressway
|style="text-align:right;"|101.6
|style="text-align:center;"|
|
|-
!style="background-color:#BFB;"|PA
|Naruto-Nishi PA
|
|style="text-align:right;"|108.2108.5
|style="text-align:center;"|○
|Sakaide-boundNaruto-bound
|-
! style="background:#bfb;"|8
|Itano IC
|Pref. Route 229 (Itano Inter Route) 
|style="text-align:right;"|110.5
|style="text-align:center;"|
|
|Itano
|-
! style="background:#bfb;"|9
|Hiketa IC
|Pref. Route 40 (Shirotori Hiketa Route) 
|style="text-align:right;"|123.3
|style="text-align:center;"|○
|
|rowspan="3"|Higashikagawa
|rowspan="14" style="width:1em;"|Kagawa
|-
! style="background:#bfb;"|10
|Shirotori-Hiketa IC
|Pref. Route 41 (Shirotori-Hiketa Inter Route) 
|style="text-align:right;"|128.5
|style="text-align:center;"|
|
|-
!style="background-color:#BFB;"|BS
|Ōchi BS
|
|style="text-align: right;"|130.2
|style="text-align: center;"|○
|
|-
! style="background:#bfb;"|11
|Tsuda-Higashi IC
| National Route 11
|style="text-align:right;"|136.2
|style="text-align:center;"|
|
|rowspan="5"|Sanuki
|-
!style="background-color:#BFB;"|SA
|Tsuda-no-matsubara SA/BS
|
|style="text-align: right;"|137.3
|style="text-align: center;"|○
|
|-
! style="background:#bfb;"|12
|Tsuda-Samukawa IC
|Pref. Route 37 (Miki Tsuda Route) 
|style="text-align:right;"|141.4
|style="text-align:center;"|
|
|-
! style="background:#bfb;"|13
|Shido IC
|Pref. Route 141 (Ishida Higashishido Route) 
|style="text-align:right;"|144.8
|style="text-align:center;"|
|
|-
!style="background-color:#BFB;"|BS
|Shido BS
|
|style="text-align: right;"|146.4
|style="text-align: center;"|○
|
|-
! style="background:#bfb;"|14
|Sanuki-Miki IC
|style="background-color:#ffdddd;"| National Route 11 (Takamatsu-Higashi Bypass)Pref. Route 38 (Miki Mure Route) 
|style="background-color:#ffdddd; text-align:right;"|149.5
|style="background-color:#ffdddd; text-align:center;"|
|style="background-color:#ffdddd;"|Sakaide-bound exit, Naruto-bound entrance only
|rowspan="2"|Miki
|-
!style="background-color:#BFB;"|BS
|Shishi-no-sato Miki BS
|
|style="text-align: right;"|150.9
|style="text-align: center;"|○
|
|-
!style="background:#bfb;"|15
|Takamatsu-Higashi IC
|style="background-color:#ffdddd;"| National Route 11 (Takamatsu-Higashi Bypass)
|style="background-color:#ffdddd; text-align:right;"|152.4
|style="background-color:#ffdddd; text-align:center;"|
|style="background-color:#ffdddd;"|Naruto-bound exit, Sakaide-bound entrance only
|rowspan="4"|Takamatsu
|-
! style="background:#bfb;"|16
|Takamatsu-Chūō IC
|Pref. Route 43 (Chūtoku Mitani Takamatsu Route) 
|style="text-align:right;"|156.3
|style="text-align:center;"|△
|
|-
!style="background:#bfb;"|17
|Takamatsu-Danshi IC
|style="background-color:#ffdddd;"| National Route 11 (Takamatsu-Minami Bypass)
|style="background-color:#ffdddd; text-align:right;"|162.9
|style="background-color:#ffdddd; text-align:center;"|
|style="background-color:#ffdddd;"|Sakaide-bound exit, Naruto-bound entrance only
|-
!style="background:#bfb;"|1
|Takamatsu-Nishi IC
|style="background-color:#ffdddd;"|Pref. Route 12 (Miki Kokubunji Route) 
|style="background-color:#ffdddd; text-align:right;"|165.4
|style="background-color:#ffdddd; text-align:center;"|
|style="background-color:#ffdddd;"|Naruto-bound exit, Sakaide-bound entrance only
|-

Takamatsu-Nishi IC - Kawanoe JCT 
{| class="wikitable"
|-
!style="border-bottom:3px solid green;"|No.
!style="border-bottom:3px solid green;"|Name
!style="border-bottom:3px solid green;"|Connections
!style="border-bottom:3px solid green;"|Dist. fromOrigin
!style="border-bottom:3px solid green;"|Bus Stop
!style="border-bottom:3px solid green;"|Notes
!colspan="2" style="border-bottom:3px solid green;"|Location
|-
!style="background:#bfb;"|1
|Takamatsu-Nishi IC
|style="background-color:#ffdddd;"|Pref. Route 12 (Miki Kokubunji Route) 
|style="background-color:#ffdddd; text-align:right;"|0.0
|style="background-color:#ffdddd; text-align:center;"|
|style="background-color:#ffdddd;"|Naruto-bound exit, Sakaide-bound entrance only
|Takamatsu
|rowspan="11" style="width:1em;"|Kagawa
|-
!style="background-color:#BFB;"|1-1
|Fuchūko PA/SIC
|
|style="text-align:right;"|7.3
|style="text-align:center;"|
|
|rowspan="2"|Sakaide
|-
! style="background:#bfb;"|2
|Sakaide JCT
|for  Seto-Chūō Expressway (Sakaide Route)
|style="text-align:right;"|14.0
|style="text-align:center;"|
|
|-
!style="background-color:#BFB;"|BS
|Marugame BS
|
|style="text-align: right;"|17.2
|style="text-align: center;"|○
|
|Marugame
|-
!style="background-color:#BFB;"|3
|Zentsuji IC
| National Route 319
|style="text-align: right;"|21.6
|style="text-align: center;"|○
|
|Zentsuji
|-
!style="background:#bfb;"|3-1
|Mitoyo-Tossaka IC
|style="background-color:#ffdddd;"|Pref. Route 220 (Ōmi Yoshizu Niō Route) 
|style="background-color:#ffdddd; text-align:right;"|29.5
|style="background-color:#ffdddd; text-align:center;"|
|style="background-color:#ffdddd;"|Kawanoe-bound exit, Sakaide-bound entrance only
|rowspan="3"|Mitoyo
|-
!style="background-color:#BFB;"|PA
|Takase PA
|
|style="text-align:right;"|32.2
|style="text-align:center;"|◆
|
|-
!style="background-color:#BFB;"|4
|Sanuki-Toyonaka IC
| National Route 11
|style="text-align:right;"|36.3
|style="text-align:center;"|
|
|-
!style="background-color:#BFB;"|BS
|Kan'onji BS/SIC
|
|style="text-align: right;"|40.8
|style="text-align: center;"|○
|Planned Smart Interchange
|rowspan="3"|Kan'onji
|-
!style="background-color:#BFB;"|5
|Ōnohara IC
| National Route 11
|style="text-align:right;"|45.3
|style="text-align:center;"|
|
|-
!style="background-color:#BFB;"|SA
|Toyohama SA
|
|style="text-align:right;"|49.049.5
|style="text-align:center;"|◆
|Sakaide-boundKawanoe-bound
|-
! style="background:#bfb;"|6
|Kawanoe JCT
| Matsuyama Expressway Kōchi Expressway
|style="text-align:right;"|56.8
|style="text-align:center;"|
|
|Shikokuchūō
|style="width:1em;"|Ehime
|-
|colspan="8" style="text-align:center;"|Through to  Matsuyama Expressway

Sakaide Route 
{| class="wikitable"
|-
!style="border-bottom:3px solid green;"|No.
!style="border-bottom:3px solid green;"|Name
!style="border-bottom:3px solid green;"|Connections
!style="border-bottom:3px solid green;"|Dist. fromOrigin
!style="border-bottom:3px solid green;"|Bus Stop
!style="border-bottom:3px solid green;"|Notes
!style="border-bottom:3px solid green;"|Location(all in Kagawa)
|-
|colspan="8" style="text-align:center;"|Through to  Seto-Chūō Expressway 
|-
!style="background-color: #BFB;"|TB
|Sakaide TB
|style="background-color:#dcdcfe;"|
|style="background-color:#dcdcfe; text-align:right; "|500.0
|style="background-color:#dcdcfe;"|
|style="background-color:#dcdcfe;"|Sakaide-bound entrance only
|rowspan="3"|Sakaide
|-
!style="background-color:#BFB;"|5
|Sakaide IC
| National Route 11 (Sakaide-Marugame Bypass)
|style="text-align:right;"|500.0
|style="text-align:center;"|◆
|
|-
!style="background-color:#BFB;"|2
|Sakaide JTC
|for Naruto, Shikokuchūō (Main Route)
|style="text-align:right;"|502.0
|style="text-align:center;"|
|
|-
|colspan="8" style="text-align:center;"|Through to  Matsuyama Expressway 

To prevent confusion with the main route, kilometer markers along the Sakaide Route show the distance from Sakaide Junction plus 500 (the marker at Sakaide Interchange is 500.0 while the marker at Sakaide Junction is 502.0).

References

External links 
 West Nippon Expressway Company

Expressways in Japan